Pseudaletis catori, the Cator's fantasy, is a butterfly in the family Lycaenidae. It is found in Togo and northern Nigeria. The habitat consists of forests.

References

Butterflies described in 1926
Pseudaletis